Crohn's and Colitis Canada is a Canadian national volunteer-based charity dedicated to finding cures for Crohn's disease and ulcerative colitis and to improving the lives of children and adults affected by these chronic conditions.

History 
Crohn's and Colitis Canada, formerly known as Crohn's and Colitis Foundation of Canada, was started in 1974 by a group of concerned parents who saw the need to raise funds for Crohn's and colitis research and to educate patients and their families about these diseases. In a short time span, this small group of dedicated parents has grown to a large, national organization, with thousands of volunteers and chapters from coast-to-coast.

Medical research is the best hope for finding a cure for Crohn's disease and ulcerative colitis, the two main forms of inflammatory bowel disease (IBD). To date, Crohn's and Colitis Canada has invested more than $101 million in major research projects and is Canada's largest non-governmental funder of Crohn's and colitis research (and the second largest in the world).

Patient programs, advocacy and awareness are also part of Crohn's and Colitis Canada's mandate. They provide information on these diseases to patients, their families, health professionals and the general public through education brochures, in-person and online events, chapter meetings, programs, and their website.

Main fundraising events 
Crohn's and Colitis Canada hosts many fundraising events throughout the year, including the Gutsy Walk held in June in over 60 communities across Canada, as well as other national and local events. Volunteers are involved in all events, and there are many events taking place throughout the year in communities large and small.

See also
 Crohn's & Colitis Foundation of America
Crohn's and Colitis UK
 Guts UK

References

External links 
 Official Web Site
https://www.charityintelligence.ca/charity-details/259-crohn-s-and-colitis-canada

Health charities in Canada
Organizations established in 1974
Medical and health organizations based in Ontario